Aristonous may refer to:
 Aristonous of Pella, a bodyguards of Alexander the Great
 Aristonous, one of the founders of the ancient Greek city of Agrigento (now in Italy)
 Aristonous of Aegina, an ancient Greek artist
 Aristonous, an ancient Greek Harpist, six times victor at the Pythian games